Africa to America: The Journey of the Drum is an album by vocal and instrumental ensemble Sounds of Blackness, released in 1994. It includes the singles "I'm Going All the Way", "I Believe", "Everything Is Gonna Be Alright" and "Black Butterfly".

Critical reception

In a review for AllMusic, Jason Birchmeier gave the album four out of five stars, commenting that producers Jimmy Jam and Terry Lewis were "on top of their game" at the time of the album's release, and that they "brought no shortage of their trademark dense percussive rhythms" to the album. He went on to say that "even if the production sounds a little calculated and perhaps even outdated for its time, it made for some amazing songs."

Africa to America: The Journey of the Drum won Best Gospel Album at the 1995 Soul Train Music Awards.

Singles
In 1993, the year before the release of the album, "I'm Going All the Way" had been released as a single in the United Kingdom, reaching No. 27 in the UK Singles Chart. In 1994, "I Believe" was released as the next single from the album, reaching No. 99 on the Billboard Hot 100 in the United States, No. 15 on Hot R&B/Hip-Hop Songs, No. 1 on Dance Club Songs and No. 17 in the UK Singles Chart. "Everything Is Gonna Be Alright" reached No. 29 on Hot R&B/Hip-Hop Songs, No. 10 on Dance Club Songs and No. 29 in the UK. "I'm Going All the Way" was re-released in the UK in early 1995, this time reaching No. 14, becoming the highest-charting Sounds of Blackness single in that country. The single also saw a release in the US, reaching No. 39 on Hot R&B/Hip-Hop Songs and No. 41 on Dance Club Songs. "Black Butterfly" reached No. 86 on Hot R&B/Hip-Hop Songs.

Track listing

Personnel
Adapted from AllMusic.

Musicians

Robert Anderson – vocals
Jamecia Bennett – background vocals
Robin Berry – harp
Dexter Conyers – vocals
Core Cotton –	vocals
LaSalle Gabriel – guitar
Shirley Marie Graham – vocals
Trenon Graham – drums, percussion
Carrie Harrington – vocals, background vocals
Jayn Higgins - vocals
Gary Hines – arranger, drum programming, keyboards, piano
Jimmy Jam – arranger, drum programming, keyboards, synthesizer
Geoffrey Jones – vocals
Patricia Lacy – vocals
Terry Lewis – arranger
Eunique Mack – vocals
Renee McCall – vocals, background vocals
Ann Nesby – bass, vocal arrangement, vocals
Kevin Pierce – guitar
Alecia Russell – vocals
Nate Sabin – guitar
Larry Sims – trumpet
James Smith – vocals
Sounds of Blackness – instrumental, primary artist, vocals, background vocals
Billy Steele – keyboards, vocal arrangement, vocals
Jeff Taylor – drum programming
Libby Turner – vocals, background vocals
Franklin Wharton – alto sax
Kevin Whitlock – percussion
Stokley Williams – drums, percussion
Louis J. Wilson – tenor sax
Marcus Wise – tabla
David Wright III – baritone sax
Jimmy Wright – arranger, keyboards, organ, electric piano, synthesizer, vocals
Rev. Joseph Young, Jr. – rap

Production
Brian Gardner – mastering
Gary Hines – producer
Steve Hodge – engineer, mixing
Jimmy Jam and Terry Lewis – executive producer, producer
David Rideau – mixing
Brent Rollins – artwork
Jeff Taylor – assistant engineer

Charts

Certifications

References

External links
Africa to America: The Journey of the Drum at Discogs

1994 albums
A&M Records albums
Albums produced by Jimmy Jam and Terry Lewis
Sounds of Blackness albums